David Homeyer Rowe (born June 20, 1945) is a former American football defensive tackle in the NFL and sports commentator.

Football career 
Born in Neptune City, New Jersey and raised in Deptford Township, New Jersey, Rowe played high school football at Deptford Township High School and college football at Penn State, where he was on the first team coached by Joe Paterno.

He was a second-round draft pick for the New Orleans Saints, where he played for four seasons and was picked for the Pro Bowl in his second season. Following a change of head coaches at the Saints, Rowe was traded to the New England Patriots in 1971, where he played for three seasons under three different coaches. After one full season with the San Diego Chargers, where he served as team captain, he was traded to the Oakland Raiders one game into the 1975 season; the Raiders went on to win Super Bowl XI the following season. He spent his last season with the Baltimore Colts.

Broadcasting career 
After retiring from the NFL in 1979, Rowe worked as a sportscaster for NBC Sports on its Sportsworld series, where he covered sumo, weightlifting and other "non-traditional" sports. In 1987, Rowe was the color analyst alongside Gayle Sierens, who became the first female NFL play-by-play announcer when she called a Seattle Seahawks–Kansas City Chiefs matchup for NBC. He later broadcast college football games for Raycom and Jefferson Pilot, and won an Emmy Award for his last broadcast, where he provided commentary on a game between Central Michigan and Georgia in 2008.

Personal life 
Rowe is a devout Christian and co-founded the Professional Athletes Outreach ministry with eleven other NFL players; he also spoke on two Billy Graham crusades and attended a White House prayer breakfast.

Rowe lived in Asheboro, North Carolina from 1975 to 2007, when he moved to Boone, North Carolina.

References

Living people
1945 births
American football defensive tackles
Baltimore Colts players
National Football League announcers
New England Patriots players
New Orleans Saints players
Oakland Raiders players
Penn State Nittany Lions football players
People from Deptford Township, New Jersey
People from Neptune City, New Jersey
San Diego Chargers players
Players of American football from New Jersey
Sportspeople from Gloucester County, New Jersey
Sportspeople from Monmouth County, New Jersey